Centaur was a 188-ton iron brig built in Aberdeen, Scotland, in 1849.

Centaur sank after striking the southern section of Marmion Reef on 9 December 1874 while travelling from Champion Bay to Fremantle. All nine crew and four passengers, including noted politician and lawyer Septimus Burt, survived.

The reef is now named Centaur Reef, and is part of Marmion Marine Park north of Perth, Western Australia.

References

External links
 Public Art Around the World – Centaur Memorial 

1849 ships
Brigs
Shipwrecks of Western Australia
Maritime incidents in December 1874
Ships built in Aberdeen
1849 in Scotland
1874 in Australia
1874 disasters in Australia
1874 disasters in Oceania